Santiago Sinclair Oyaneder (born 29 December 1927) was a Chilean Army general and member of the Government Junta from 1988 to 1990 that ruled Chile from 1973–1990.

Footnotes

Living people
Chilean Army generals
1927 births
20th-century Chilean military personnel